Frank Lowson (13 December 1895–1969) was a Scottish footballer who played in the Football League for Barrow, Bradford (Park Avenue) and Exeter City.

References

1895 births
1969 deaths
Scottish footballers
Association football forwards
English Football League players
Dundee F.C. players
Bradford (Park Avenue) A.F.C. players
Exeter City F.C. players
Barrow A.F.C. players
Poole Town F.C. players